Players and pairs who neither have high enough rankings nor receive wild cards may participate in a qualifying tournament held one week before the annual Wimbledon Tennis Championships.

Seeds

  Antony Dupuis (second round)
  Stéphane Huet (qualified)
  Kevin Ullyett (first round)
  Gastón Etlis (second round)
  Fredrik Jonsson (qualifying competition, lucky loser)
  Cyril Saulnier (qualifying competition, lucky loser)
  David Prinosil (qualified)
  James Sekulov (first round)
  Sébastien Lareau (qualifying competition, lucky loser)
  Harel Levy (qualified)
  Marcos Ondruska (second round)
  Wayne Black (qualifying competition, lucky loser)
   (first round)
  Kevin Kim (first round)
  Cristiano Caratti (second round)
  Petr Luxa (second round)
  Axel Pretzsch (first round)
  Tuomas Ketola (first round)
  Christian Vinck (qualified)
  Werner Eschauer (qualifying competition, lucky loser)
  Michaël Llodra (qualified)
  Dejan Petrovic (qualified)
  Óscar Burrieza (second round)
  Sebastián Prieto (first round)
  Michael Kohlmann (qualifying competition, lucky loser)
  Alejandro Hernández (second round)
  Michael Russell (qualified)
  Alex O'Brien (qualified)
  Mark Nielsen (first round)
  Mariano Hood (second round)
  Răzvan Sabău (first round)
  Mark Knowles (first round)

Qualifiers

  Vladimir Voltchkov
  Stéphane Huet
  Igor Gaudi
  Olivier Rochus
  Alex O'Brien
  Michael Russell
  David Prinosil
  Neville Godwin
  Paul Kilderry
  Harel Levy
  Michaël Llodra
  Dejan Petrovic
  Jürgen Melzer
  Christian Vinck
  Justin Bower
  Taylor Dent

Lucky losers

  Fredrik Jonsson
  Cyril Saulnier
  Sébastien Lareau
  Wayne Black
  Werner Eschauer
  Michael Kohlmann

Qualifying draw

First qualifier

Second qualifier

Third qualifier

Fourth qualifier

Fifth qualifier

Sixth qualifier

Seventh qualifier

Eighth qualifier

Ninth qualifier

Tenth qualifier

Eleventh qualifier

Twelfth qualifier

Thirteenth qualifier

Fourteenth qualifier

Fifteenth qualifier

Sixteenth qualifier

External links

 2000 Wimbledon Championships – Men's draws and results at the International Tennis Federation

Men's Singles Qualifying
Wimbledon Championship by year – Men's singles qualifying